Bai Faquan (白 发全, born 18 March 1986) is a Chinese triathlete who won individual and team bronze medals at the 2014 Asian Games. He placed 46th-50th at the 2012 and 2016 Olympics.

Bai started as a swimmer and changed to triathlon in 2007. He trains 364 days per year.

References

External links 

 
 

1986 births
Living people
Chinese male triathletes
Triathletes at the 2012 Summer Olympics
Triathletes at the 2016 Summer Olympics
Olympic triathletes of China
Asian Games medalists in triathlon
Triathletes at the 2014 Asian Games
People from Dali
Asian Games bronze medalists for China
Medalists at the 2014 Asian Games
21st-century Chinese people